Compsoctena minor is a moth in the family Eriocottidae. It was first described by Walsingham in 1866. It is found in India.

References

Moths described in 1866
Compsoctena
Moths of Asia